Antonio de Miraballis (died 1503) was a Roman Catholic prelate who served as Bishop of Lettere-Gragnano (1478–1503).

Biography
On 14 January 1478, Antonio de Miraballis was appointed during the papacy of Pope Sixtus IV as Bishop of Lettere-Gragnano.
He served as Bishop of Lettere-Gragnano until his death in 1503.

References

External links and additional sources
 (for Chronology of Bishops) 
 (for Chronology of Bishops)  

15th-century Italian Roman Catholic bishops
16th-century Italian Roman Catholic bishops
Bishops appointed by Pope Sixtus IV
1503 deaths